Johann Heinrich Zorn (1698–1748) was a Protestant pastor and ornithologist. He was the author of a work in two volumes entitled  Petino-Theologie oder Versuch, Die Menschen durch nähere Betrachtung Der Vögel Zur Bewunderung Liebe und Verehrung ihres mächtigsten, weissest- und gütigsten Schöpffers aufzumuntern (1742–1743). This can be translated as "Ornithotheology, or an encouragement to humanity, through a careful observation of birds, towards admiration, love and respect for their powerful, of the wise and good Creator." Zorn who was heavily influenced by the work, far ahead of its time, of the ornithologist Ferdinand Johann Adam von Pernau (1660–1731), and aimed to proclaim the divine power to his readers. His comments are very fair, and he is one of the first to observe the role of the colour of birds or eggs in their camouflage. He played a significant role in the dissemination of Ornithology in Germany even though the ethological work he did was not advanced much until the 20th century.

References
Michael Walters (2003). A Concise History of Ornithology, Yale University Press (New Haven, Connecticut): 255 p.

External links
Zoologica Göttingen State and University Library digitised Petino-Theologie....

German ornithologists
1698 births
1748 deaths